Lacida  is a genus of tussock moths in the family Erebidae. The genus was erected by Francis Walker in 1855.

Species
The following species are included in the genus:
 Lacida antica Walker, 1855
 Lacida biplagata Heylaerts, 1892
 Lacida costalis Walker, 1855
 Lacida incomptaria Walker, 1862
 Lacida morawae van Eecke, 1928
 Lacida vertiginosa van Eecke, 1928

References

Lymantriinae
Noctuoidea genera